Ted Hill (15 January 1914 - 1 July 1986) was a former Australian rules footballer who played with Collingwood and Fitzroy in the Victorian Football League (VFL).

Hill joined Coburg Football Club as a 16 year old in 1930, spending three years with them, before joining Collingwood. 

Hill was captain / coach of Kalgoorlie Railways in their 1948 premiership season, then in 1949, he coached Yallourn to a premiership in the Central Gippsland Football League

Hill was appointed as captain / coach of Culcairn in 1952 and lead them to the 1952 Albury & District Football League premiership.

Notes

External links 

1952 - Albury & DFL Premiers: Culcairn FC team photo

1914 births
1986 deaths
Australian rules footballers from Victoria (Australia)
Collingwood Football Club players
Fitzroy Football Club players
Coburg Football Club players